Hiroyuki Hayashi may refer to:

, Japanese footballer
, Japanese sprinter
, Japanese musician